Karenga may refer to:

Karenga (river), Transbaikalia, Russia

Places

New Zealand
Karenga Park, a city park in Rotorua

Uganda
Karenga Community Wildlife Management Area, a locally managed conservation zone adjacent to Kidepo Valley National Park
Karenga sub-county, a sub-county in Karenga District
Karenga, a town in Karenga District

People
Maulana Karenga, an African-American activist and author